Nevada Smith is a 1975 American Western television film starring Cliff Potts, Adam West and Lorne Greene, based on the 1966 feature film Nevada Smith.

This was a pilot for an unsold Western series. These characters were first introduced in the theatrical feature of the same title in 1966, and before that in 1964's The Carpetbaggers. Potts and Greene had the roles played earlier by Steve McQueen and Brian Keith (in the namesake movie) and by Alan Ladd and Leif Erickson in The Carpetbaggers.

Plot
A half-breed gunslinger and a friend he hasn't seen in years join together to escort a shipment of explosives across Utah.

Cast
 Cliff Potts as Nevada Smith 
 Lorne Greene as Jonas Cord 
 Adam West as Frank Hartlee
 Warren Vanders as Red Fickett
 Roger Cudney as Perkins

References

External links

See also
 List of American films of 1975

1975 television films
1975 Western (genre) films
American Western (genre) television films
Films directed by Gordon Douglas
1970s English-language films